DB ProjektBau GmbH was a German company that carried out and supported large-scale railway projects for Germany's national rail carrier, Deutsche Bahn (DB). It was created on 1 January 2003 as a subsidiary of the DB.

In 2016, it was merged with DB international into DB Engineering & Consulting GmbH.

Deutsche Bahn
Railway companies of Germany
Railway companies established in 2003